The 2016–17 Ukrainian Cup  is the 26th annual season of Ukraine's football knockout competition.
The decision on a schedule of competitions for clubs from the First and Second League in composition will be confirmed by the Central Council of the Professional Football League of Ukraine and the competition will start on 20 July 2016.

Team allocation

Distribution

Competition schedule

First Preliminary round (1/64)

In this round entered 8 clubs from the Second League and two representatives from the 2015 Ukrainian Amateur Cup. The round matches will be played on 20 July 2016.

Notes: Arsenal-Kyivshchyna Bila Tserkva informed the PFL that due to the financial situation that they would not play the match. Balkany Zorya advance to the next round.
 The competition allows for the finalists of the Ukrainian Amateur Cup. However the finalist of the 2015 Ukrainian Amateur Cup, Balkany Zorya joined the PFL. Hence the PFL replaced their vacated spot with the highest-ranked team from the semi-finals of the Amateur Cup (Ahrobiznes TSK Romny).

Second Preliminary round (1/32)

In this round, 18 clubs from First League and the higher-seeded clubs from the Second League entered. They were drawn against the five winners of the First Preliminary Round.
The round matches were played on 10 August 2016.

Round of 20 (1/16)

In this round six teams from the 2016–17 Ukrainian Premier League (bottom placed) and 14 winners from the Second Preliminary round enter this stage of the competition which also includes 10 teams from the 2016–17 Ukrainian First League, 4 teams from the 2016–17 Ukrainian Second League. The draw for this round was held on 17 August 2016 at the House of Football in Kyiv.Notes Due to reconstruction of the pitch at Chernihiv Stadium, match moved to Sonyachny Training Center.

Round of 16 (1/8)

In this round, six teams from the 2016–17 Ukrainian Premier League (top placed) and 10 winners from the Round of 20 enter this stage of the competition which also includes 3 more teams from the 2016–17 Ukrainian Premier League, 7 teams from the 2016–17 Ukrainian First League. The draw was held on 23 September 2016 at the House of Football in Kyiv.Notes: Due to reconstruction of the pitch at Chernihiv Stadium, match moved to Obolon Arena.

Quarterfinals

In this round will participate 4 teams from the 2016–17 Ukrainian Premier League and 4 teams from the 2016–17 Ukrainian First League. The draw was held on 27 October 2016 at the House of Football in Kyiv.Notes: Originally the match was scheduled for November 30 but was postponed due to the frozen pitch at Naftovyk Stadium being unplayable.
 Originally the match was scheduled for November 30 but was postponed due to the frozen pitch at Lokomotyv Stadium being unplayable.
 Control-Disciplinary Committee of the FFU awards a 3–0 technical victory to Shakhtar due to the state of the pitch at Lokomotyv Stadium'''Semifinals

In this round will participate 3 teams from the 2016–17 Ukrainian Premier League and 1 team from the 2016–17 Ukrainian First League. The draw was held on 6 April 2017 at the Hilton hotel in Kyiv. During the draw there was identified a host for the final whom will be the winner of Shakhtar-Dnipro pair.

Final

Top goalscorers
The competition's top ten goalscorers including qualification rounds.

See also 
2016–17 Ukrainian Premier League
2016–17 Ukrainian First League
2016–17 Ukrainian Second League
2016–17 UEFA Europa League

Notes

References

Cup
Ukrainian Cup
Ukrainian Cup seasons